Pia Eidmann (born 26 August 1984) is a German field hockey player who competed in the 2008 Summer Olympics.

References

External links
 

1984 births
Living people
German female field hockey players
Olympic field hockey players of Germany
Field hockey players at the 2008 Summer Olympics